Israel competed at the 2014 Winter Olympics in Sochi, Russia. The team consisted of five athletes. Vladislav Bykanov was the first male athlete to qualify from Israel in short track speed skating.

Competitors

Alpine skiing 

According to the quota allocation released on January 20, 2014 Israel had qualified two athletes, however only one athlete was selected to compete. Virgile Vandeput missed both races he was entered in, as he was injured during training.

Figure skating 

Three skaters qualified to represent Israel. Alexei Bychenko finished the men's singles competition in 21st out of 30 competitors. Andrea Davidovich and Evgeni Krasnopolski finished the pairs skating competition in 15th place out of 20 pairs.

Short track speed skating

Israel achieved the following quota place: Vladislav Bykanov failed to advance out of the opening heats in all three of his events.

Men

Non-qualified athletes
Bradley Chalupski attempted to qualify in skeleton but had difficulty convincing the Israeli Olympic Committee to allow him to do so. A group of female alpine skiers also competed and qualified, but Israel decided not to use its quota it earned.

See also
Israel at the 2014 Summer Youth Olympics

References

External links 

Israel at the 2014 Winter Olympics 

Nations at the 2014 Winter Olympics
2014
Winter Olympics